The Cliffside Hose Company No. 4, is located in Montclair, Essex County, New Jersey, United States. The firehouse was built in 1901 and added to the National Register of Historic Places on July 1, 1988. The firehouse was built to protect the north end of Montclair and currently houses Montclair Fire Department's Engine 2 and Truck 2.

See also
National Register of Historic Places listings in Essex County, New Jersey

References

Fire stations completed in 1891
Queen Anne architecture in New Jersey
Buildings and structures in Essex County, New Jersey
Fire stations on the National Register of Historic Places in New Jersey
Montclair, New Jersey
National Register of Historic Places in Essex County, New Jersey
1891 establishments in New Jersey
New Jersey Register of Historic Places